Dimitrios Souanis (born 17 November 1985) is a Greek footballer.

Souanis began his professional football career with Panionios in 2002.

Career stats

Last update: 5 December 2014

References

1985 births
Living people
Greek footballers
Super League Greece players
Football League (Greece) players
Cypriot First Division players
Panionios F.C. players
Olympiacos Volos F.C. players
Panthrakikos F.C. players
Xanthi F.C. players
Apollon Limassol FC players
People from Chalkidiki
Diagoras F.C. players
Association football forwards
Footballers from Central Macedonia